The 2020–21 Rice Owls women's basketball team represents Rice University during the 2020–21 NCAA Division I women's basketball season. The team is led by sixth-year head coach Tina Langley, and plays their home games at the Tudor Fieldhouse in Houston, Texas as a member of Conference USA.

Schedule and results

|-
!colspan=12 style=|Non-conference regular season

|-
!colspan=12 style=|CUSA regular season

|-
!colspan=12 style=| CUSA Tournament

|-
!colspan=12 style=| WNIT

See also
 2020–21 Rice Owls men's basketball team

Notes

References

Rice Owls women's basketball seasons
Rice Owls
Rice Owls women's basketball
Rice Owls women's basketball
Rice
Women's National Invitation Tournament championship seasons